Peangtarn Plipuech and Jessy Rompies were the defending champions but Rompies chose not to participate.

Plipuech partnered alongside Moyuka Uchijima, but lost in the final to Varvara Flink and CoCo Vandeweghe, 3–6, 6–7(3–7).

Seeds

Draw

Draw

References

External Links
Main Draw

Thoreau Tennis Open - Doubles